Bocoyna is one of the 67 municipalities of Chihuahua, in northern Mexico. The municipal seat lies at Bocoyna. The municipality covers an area of 2,801.8 km².

As of 2010, the municipality had a total population of 28,766, down from 29,907 as of 2005. 

As of 2010, the town of Bocoyna had a population of 796. Other than the town of Bocoyna, the municipality had 633 localities, the largest of which (with 2010 populations in parentheses) were: San Juanito (10,535), classified as urban, and Creel (5,026) and Sisoguichi (1,097), classified as rural. 

The municipality and its seat are located on the route of the Chihuahua Pacific Railroad.

Geography

Towns and villages

References

Municipalities of Chihuahua (state)